Chittu Pandey (10 May 1895 – 6 December 1946), popularly referred to as the Sher-e Ballia (Lion of Ballia), was an Indian independence activist and revolutionary.

Pandey was born in Rattuchak, a village in Ballia District of Uttar Pradesh in a Brahmin family.

A distinguished independence activist, he led the Quit India Movement in Ballia; described as the "Tiger of Ballia" by Jawaharlal Nehru and Subhas Chandra Bose, he headed the National Government declared and established on 19 August 1942 for a few days before it was suppressed by the British. The parallel government succeeded in getting the Collector to hand over power and release all the arrested Congress leaders. But within a week, soldiers marched in and the leaders had to flee. He used to call himself a Gandhian.
There is a crossroads also on the name of Chittu Pandey.

Pandey ji had two childrens. Boy's name was Maksudan pandey and daughter's name was Lalita Devi.

References

Indian independence activists from Uttar Pradesh
People from Ballia district
1865 births
1946 deaths